Sweet Home High School may refer to:

Sweet Home High School (New York), located in Amherst, New York
Sweet Home High School (Oregon), located in Sweet Home, Oregon

See also
 Sweet Home (disambiguation)